Object language can refer to 

 The language that is described by a metalanguage.
 A language which is the object of a formal specification.
 The target language of a translator.